Sandy Springs is a city in the U.S. state of Georgia.

Sandy Springs or Sandy Spring may also refer to:

Sandy Springs, Ohio, an unincorporated community
Sandy Springs, South Carolina
Sandy Springs (MARTA station), an underground metro station on the MARTA system in Atlanta
Ashton-Sandy Spring, Maryland, a census-designated place (CDP) in Montgomery County, Maryland
Sandy Spring, Maryland

See also
Sandy Spring Bank, a community bank serving Maryland and Virginia
Sandy Spring Friends School, a Quaker school in Sandy Spring, Maryland
Sandy Springs Middle School
Sandy Springs Park, a public park in Maryville, Tennessee